João Bosco Gomes Saraiva (born 10 October 1959) often simply known as Bosco Saraiva is a Brazilian politician and a businessman. Born in Amazonas, he has served as a state representative since 2019, having also served as vice governor and in the state legislature.

Personal life
Saraiva is married to Bruna Lorena Passos Saraiva and is an alumnus of the Universidade Paulista (UNIP). Aside from being a politician he is also a professor, writer, and businessman.

Political career
Saraiva was elected to the legislative assembly of Amazonas in the 2014 local election with 22,822 votes under the Brazilian Social Democracy Party's banner. In October 2017 Amazonino Mendes was elected governor of the state and choose Saraiva as his vice-governor. In the 2018 Brazilian general election he was elected to the federal chamber of deputies, being one of the most voted candidates in the state of Amazonas. He is also the head of the solidarity party in the state of Amazonas.

References

1959 births
Living people
People from Manaus
Solidariedade politicians
Brazilian businesspeople
Brazilian writers
Brazilian educators
Members of the Chamber of Deputies (Brazil) from Amazonas
Members of the Legislative Assembly of Amazonas